Aishath Rishmy Rameez (born 15 November 1985) is a Maldivian actress film producer and director.

Early life
Born in Malé, Maldives, Rishmy is the daughter of actor Aminath Rasheedha. She is the elder sister of actress Mariyam Azza. They reside in Vilingili since the early days when the island was made a satellite town of Male. Rishmy completed her secondary education from Aminiya School and accomplished her higher education from Centre for Higher Secondary Education.
 
Rishmy made a brief cameo appearance in the film Mithuru, along with Mariyam Azza, which was produced by her step-father Ahmed Shiyam and co-starring with Rasheedha. Though she is particularly known for her on-screen appearances, Rishmy is more interested in the production process. After graduating from Centre for Higher Secondary Education, Rishmy made her official screen debut in Yaara's production debut album Yaaraa (2004), where she was featured in three songs; out of which she had penned lyrics for one. Apart from starring in their second production venture Yaaraa 2 (2005), Rishmy did directing and editing work by herself for most of the songs.

Career

2006–2013: Early work
Rishmy made her acting debut with Hukuru Vileyrey, which was based on a novel published by Ibrahim Waheed on Haveeru Daily 3 years back. Apart from acting in the film, Rishmy worked as the co-director of the film, along with her mother, Rasheedha. The film was a critical and commercial success. Rishmy's role was appraised by critics in particular; most of them complimenting the scene where she tears up a raw fish and complimenting her for having the "gut" to play such a role. The film was considered as "one of the few acceptable horror movies the Maldives film industry has ever produced". For her portrayal of the character, Rishmy was nominated as the Best Actress at 5th Gaumee Film Awards ceremony. The film was later released as 15 episode Television series with inclusion of several clips that were edited off while released in theatre. She next worked with their series album Yaaraa 4 which was released in 2007.

In 2010, Yaaraa Productions released their second film, Fanaa—also directed by her—where she played the role of Mamdhooha who is influenced by her mother so much that she wants to become free from her strains. Based on a novel published by Waheed titled Balgish, the film received mixed to negative response from critics; Ali Naafiz from Haveeru Daily classified the film as the "worst Maldivian film released so far" during the year. Her character portrayal was also negatively received by Nafiz, where he found Rishmy "over-acting" and they perceived that she is "still immature for a role in a feature film". However, other critics found the performance of Rishmy to be on a "standing ovation" level, though displeased with the length of the film. At the 6th Gaumee Film Awards, she was bestowed with Best Supporting Actress award and Best Costume Design award while she was nominated as the Best Director for her work in the film.

The following year, Rishmy first appeared in Aishath Ali Manik's romantic horror film Kuhveriakee Kaakuhey? (2011) opposite Ahmed Azmeel. Inspired by the horror romantic thriller Bollywood film Darling (2007), pre-production of the film was started in 2007 and shot in Sri Lanka. It revolves around a man who cheats on his wife with his secretary, and how his life slides to a haunting shift when he accidentally kills his mistress. The film and her performance as a spirit received negative reviews from critics. "Rishmy did an average job; not bad and good either. Perhaps the director was unable to extract the best of her talent since they failed to develop her character well". The film did little business at boxoffice and was declared a flop. It was followed by another romantic horror film 14 Vileyrey, directed by Abdul Faththaah and starring Ali Seezan with Mariyam Nisha. Written by Ibrahim Waheed, the project faced controversy when the team of Kuhveriakee Kaakuhey? accuses Fatthah for "purloining the plot" of the latter. The film and her performance received mixed to positive reviews from critics; "Rishmy is the Scene-stealer of the movie. This could be her breakthrough performance since she has the star power to shine in a cast of established actors". The film did good business at box office and was declared a "Hit". At the 2nd Maldivian Film Awards, she received a nomination for Best Supporting Actress for 14 Vileyrey. She next appeared in a brief role as a news presenter in Ali Seezan's war action comedy film Wathan, which received negative response from critics.

Her next release was Ahmed Azmeel's debut direction Hiyy Yaara Dheefa (2011), starred alongside Ali Seezan, Niuma Mohamed, Ahmed Azmeel and Aminath Rasheedha. The film received negative reviews from critics pointing similarities between Bollywood comedy-drama film Ishq (1997) and Kundan Shah's family drama Dil Hai Tumhaara (2002). The film revolves around four young people from different social classes fall in love with partners who do not meet with their parents' approval. She played Nathasha, a rich girl who falls in love with a poor boy. The film did not succeed financially, but her portrayal was moderately acclaimed by critics. At the 7th Gaumee Film Awards ceremony, she received a nomination for Best Supporting Actress award. Rishmy's only release of 2012 was Abdul Faththaah's romantic film Love Story (2012) alongside Ali Seezan and Amira Ismail. The film and her performance received negative response from critics. Displeased with the screenplay and performance of the actors, Nadheem of Haveeru wrote: "None of the actors were given scope to build their characters and none was able to justify their character. With excessive emotional scenes, actors were exposed to over-acting and nothing more". Despite the negative reviews, Rishmy received her third Gaumee Film Award nomination for Best Supporting Actress and another Maldives Film Awards nomination for Best Supporting Actress.

2014–present: Critical success and Vishka

In 2014, Rishmy starred opposite Ali Seezan in his directorial venture, psychological thriller Insaana, playing the sharp-tongued wife who is murdered by her husband, apart from working as an assistant director for the film. It revolves around a murderer who tries to evade from the guilt after crime. Made on a budget of MVR 220,000, the film was inspired by Ryan Connolly's short psychological horror film Tell (2012) which is loosely based on the Edgar Allan Poe short story "The Tell-Tale Heart". Upon release, the film received widespread critical acclaim. Hassan Naail from Vaguthu called it "one of the best Maldivian release till date" and wrote; "Rishmy as the assistant director and as the lead actress has given her best for the movie. Her acting-specifically after the death-the expression and the look was sheer brilliance giving you goosebumps". At the 2015 South Asian Association for Regional Cooperation Film Festival, Insaana was bestowed with Bronze Medal as Best Film, competing with seventeen regional films.

The following year, Rishmy was seen in Ravee Farooq-directed film Mikoe Bappa Baey Baey (2015) opposite Mohamed Manik. In the film, she played the role of Aminath Shifa-a mother who is ready to do anything in her power to protect her child from any harm of adversity from a man who becomes afflicted with "Post Traumatic Amnesia". The film along with her character was critically acclaimed; Asiyath Mohamed Saeed particularly praising the acting of Rishmy—how she represented her character in its deepest. The scene where Rishmy picks "fainted" Manik over her shoulder, was pointed out by the critics; specially for showing women empowerment in a way that has never been shown in Maldivian cinema. It was one of the three entries from Maldives to the SAARC Film Festival 2016. At the 8th Gaumee Film Awards Rishmy received her second Best Actress nomination for Mikoe Bappa Baey Baey. The same year, she co-directed and starred in Fathimath Nahula's television drama series Vakivumuge Kurin (2015) by playing the devoted wife who looks after her irresponsible sister.

In 2017, Rishmy portrayed Vishka, a single-minded woman who gets trapped between an immoral person and a corrupted politician, in Ravee Farooq's crime thriller Vishka; it marked her second collaboration with Farooq. Prior to release it faced controversies as Hassan Haleel requested a deferment in release claiming he allegedly owns the story and script of the film. However, the film was cleared for exhibition with the court order, proclaiming that the ownership of the script and story belongs to Rishmy. Upon release, the film opened to positive response from critics. Mohamed Musthafa of Sun applauded its "unexpected climax" and was "astounded" to see Rishmy's role in the film. "Showcased as an independent and strong woman, Rishmy's portrayal of Vishka deserves full marks". The film was screened at the SAARC Film Festival 2017, ultimately winning the Best Actress award; becoming the first Maldivian actress to win an international award.

Personal life
In May 2007, Rishmy married one of her co-star Ahmed Azmeel; whom she shared screen space in many of her songs from their production albums. On 3 December 2008, Rishmy gave birth to a son, Ismail Aziel Azumeel, while the couple divorced few years later. She then started a relationship with Ravee Farooq. On 25 March 2019, Rishmy and Farooq married without publicity. On 9 February 2022, Rameez announced their divorce through her social media account.

Media image
In 2011, Rishmy was voted in the top three as the "Most Entertaining Actress" in the SunFM Awards 2010, an award night ceremony initiated by Sun Media Group to honour the most recognized personalities in different fields, during the previous year. In 2012, she was ranked at the tenth position in the list of "Best Actresses in Maldives" compiled by Haveeru, where writer Ahmed Nadheem labelled her as the "Queen of video songs" who brought a revelation to the industry. In 2018, she was ranked in the fourth position from Dho?'s list of Top Ten Actresses of Maldives where writer Aishath Maaha opined that Rishmy is the "most promising actress from the current generation" and an optimistic director too.

Filmography

Feature film

Television

Short film

Other work

Discography

Accolades

References

External links
 

Living people
People from Malé
21st-century Maldivian actresses
Maldivian film actresses
Maldivian film directors
1985 births
Maldivian women film directors